This is a list of episodes for the first season of Survive This, a Canadian reality TV show on which eight teenagers with limited survival skills training are taken into a forest and confronted with a number of survival challenges to test their skills and perseverance. The show is hosted by Les Stroud, who narrates each episode, provides the teens with survival challenges, and assesses their performance. The show premiered on April 7, 2009, in Canada and on June 17, 2009, in the United States. Cartoon Network ceased airing Survive This after August 19, 2009; the last episode to air was "Mountain." The final three episodes screened only on the Cartoon Network Web site.

Participants
Eight teenagers were given a week's survival training before being taken into the wilderness.  The Season One cast included:

Adam—Adam Deganis is a 15-year-old native of Mississauga, Ontario, who attends Loyola Catholic Secondary School. Labeled as "the sportsman" on the series, his survival experiences consisted of hunting, fishing, and spending summers at his family vacation home. A fan of Survivorman, he applied to be on the series because he wanted to meet Les Stroud. Deganis is an arachnophobe.
Becca—Becca Mehaffey is a 17-year-old from Markham, Ontario, who has almost no outdoors experience. Her friends and family laughed at her when she applied to be on the show. She was called "the princess" on the show, and practices dance in her spare time.
Becky—Becky Tran is a 17-year-old  from Newmarket, Ontario, who was labeled "the environmentalist" on the series, but whom the other participants called "BT." Tran, who is admittedly "addicted" to her hair iron, was frightened of dirt, germs, and insects.
Catarina—Catarina is a 17-year-old who was described as "the tough girl" on the series.
Holden—Holden Adams is a 16-year-old who was called "the city boy" on the show. After the show ended, he admitted that lack of sleep, hunger, and physical exhaustion often led him to rest while others did the work of finding food and building shelter.
Jen—Jennifer Daub is a 16-year-old resident of Blind River, Ontario. She attends W. C. Eaket Secondary School. She was labeled "the hunter" on the series because she had spent time tracking and hunting deer with her father, and was an expert rifleman, all-terrain vehicle driver, and camper. One of her older brothers learned about the show and encouraged her to apply. She applied online by sending in a photo of herself with a deer she had shot and killed, and had a telephone interview and video interview before being picked for the show. She was often frustrated by having to help other participants who had little outdoors experience.
Kareem—Kareem Ali is a 17-year-old native of Toronto, Ontario, Canada. Given the label of "the movtivator" by the producers, he was seen as more competitive than the others. He attends Bloor Collegiate Institute.
Zac—Zac Siegel is a 14-year-old resident of Thornhill, Ontario, who attends Westmount Collegiate Institute. He applied to be on the show through a survival camp he was already enrolled at. He had extensive wilderness survival skills before he joined the show, has a photographic memory, and a high-level intelligence. He was extremely frustrated on the show because the other participants had so little wilderness survival skill. "In many cases I had to teach people to start a fire or build a proper shelter, collect berries, basically I spent a lot of time with those who didn't have a clue what Les was talking about," he told the press. Labeled as "the camp counselor" by the producers, the others perceived him as an overachiever.

List of Season One (2009) episodes

Episode 7

In Episode 7, "Deep Woods, Part 2," both teams started out at relatively the same spot (see map, right). Each team was told to head east, pass through the swamp, and arrive in the meadow. Neither team was told that a lake lay in their path. The shortest course for each team would be to pass between the lakes.  Team One navigated east correctly, but then took the long way (north) around the lake. Their five-hour hike turned into a 10-hour trek. Team One arrived at the meadow, however. Team Two's navigation was errant, and the team traveled east for only a short time before drifting east-southeast. When Team Two reached the lake, they became lost and turned north when they thought they was going south.  Team Two then mistakenly doubled back to its starting point and never made it to the meadow.

References

External links
 "Survive This" official Web site
 "Survive This" on the YTV Web site
 "Survive This" on the Cartoon Network Web site

2009 Canadian television seasons